The Circle Chart Music Awards, formerly known as the Gaon Chart Music Awards, are a major music awards ceremony that is presented annually in South Korea by the Korea Music Content Association primarily based on the commercial performance of the songs and albums based on the national music record chart Circle Chart.

Since 2017, the awarding ceremony has been broadcast live worldwide via Mnet and V Live. In addition to the Gaon Chart being rebranded to the Circle Chart on July 7, 2022, it was announced the Gaon Chart Music Awards would be renamed to the Circle Chart Music Awards.

Host venues

Awards

Artist of the Year – Physical

Artist of the Year – Digital Music
Current format

Previous format

New Artist of the Year

Discovery of the Year

Music Steady Seller of the Year

Retail Album of the Year

Top Kit Seller of the Year

Popular Singer of the Year

International Song of the Year

Composer/Lyricist of the Year

Performers of the Year

Style of the Year

Record Production of the Year

Social Hot Star of the Year

Hot Performance of the Year

World K-pop Star

World K-Pop Rookie

International Rising Star of the Year

Mubeat Choice Award

Discontinued awards

K-pop Contribution Award / Lifetime Achievement Award

Mobile Vote Popularity Award

Special Awards

Hot Trend Award

Producer of the Year

New Media Platform

Music Distribution

Sound Engineer of the Year

Most awards
The following artists (arranged in alphanumeric order) has received three or more awards.

Artist of the Year – Physical

Artist of the Year – Digital

See also

References

External links 

 Official website

South Korean music awards
Awards established in 2012
Annual events in South Korea
Recurring events established in 2012